Hartford Township is one of the twenty-four townships of Trumbull County, Ohio, United States.  The 2000 census found 2,104 people in the township.

Geography
Located in the eastern part of the county, it borders the following townships:
Vernon Township - north
South Pymatuning Township, Mercer County, Pennsylvania - east
Brookfield Township - south
Vienna Township - southwest corner
Fowler Township - west
Johnston Township - northwest corner

The village of Orangeville is located in northeastern Hartford Township, and the unincorporated community of Hartford lies at the center of the township.

Name and history
Hartford Township was named after Hartford, Connecticut.

Statewide, the only other Hartford Township is located in Licking County.

Government
The township is governed by a three-member board of trustees, who are elected in November of odd-numbered years to a four-year term beginning on the following January 1. Two are elected in the year after the presidential election and one is elected in the year before it. There is also an elected township fiscal officer, who serves a four-year term beginning on April 1 of the year after the election, which is held in November of the year before the presidential election. Vacancies in the fiscal officership or on the board of trustees are filled by the remaining trustees.

Notable residents
Dave Blaney, NASCAR driver
Ryan Blaney, NASCAR driver, son of driver Dave Blaney
Chris Butler, founder and CEO of East Coast Acquisition, Inc. and owner of Little Creek Farm

References

External links

County website

Townships in Trumbull County, Ohio
Townships in Ohio